The Church of the Holy Archangels is a Romanian Orthodox church located at Aleea Parcului 5, Pașcani, Romania. Dating from 1664 and dedicated to the Archangels Michael and Gabriel, it is listed as a historic monument by Romania's Ministry of Culture and Religious Affairs.

Notes

External links

Pașcani
Historic monuments in Iași County
Churches completed in 1664
Romanian Orthodox churches in Iași County
1664 establishments in Europe